Arseny Maksimovich Logashov (born 20 August 1991) is a Russian former professional footballer who played as a centre-back or right-back.

Club career
He made his professional debut in the Russian First Division in 2008 for FC Sportakademklub Moscow.

On 3 February 2017, he moved to FC Tosno, signing a contract until the end of the 2016–17 season.

On 11 June 2017, he signed a 2-year contract with FC Baltika Kaliningrad.

On 20 June 2018, he returned to FC Rostov, signing a 3-year contract. On 16 October 2020 he returned to FC Khimki on loan. He left Rostov on 3 July 2021.

International career
He made his senior national team debut on 15 August 2012 in a friendly against Ivory Coast.

Honours
 Russia U-19
 Granatkin Memorial - winner: 2009
 Anzhi
 Russian Cup - runner-up: 2012-13
 Rostov
 Russian Cup - winner: 2013-14
Lokomotiv Moscow
Russian Cup - winner: 2014–15

References

External links
 
 

1991 births
Sportspeople from Kursk
Living people
Russian footballers
Association football defenders
Russia youth international footballers
Russia under-21 international footballers
Russia international footballers
FC Khimki players
FC Fakel Voronezh players
FC Anzhi Makhachkala players
FC Rostov players
FC Lokomotiv Moscow players
FC Tosno players
FC Baltika Kaliningrad players
Russian Premier League players
Russian First League players
FC Urozhay Krasnodar players
FC Sportakademklub Moscow players